Highland Springs Reservoir is a reservoir located about 4.5 miles southwest of Kelseyville, California adjacent to Highland Springs. The area around the reservoir as well as the reservoir itself is a popular recreation site with activities such as disc golf, and a hiking trail. The reservoir is stocked with warm water fish such as largemouth bass, sunfish, bluegill, catfish and bullhead.

References

Reservoirs in Lake County, California